The cavum Vergae is a posterior extension of the cavum septi pellucidi, an anomaly that is found in a small percentage of human brains. It was first described by Andrea Verga.

Brain
Ventricular system